Lapu-Lapu is a 2002 Filipino historical film co-produced and directed by William G. Mayo and written by Jerry O. Tirazona. It stars Lito Lapid as the titular datu, alongside Joyce Jimenez, Dante Rivero, Vic Vargas, Roi Vinzon, Jeric Raval, Ian Veneracion, Jess Lapid Jr., and Gloria Sevilla. Produced by Calinauan Cineworks, the film is based on the 1521 encounter of Datu Lapulapu and other pre-Hispanic Philippine natives with explorer Ferdinand Magellan and his crew, who were serving the Spanish Empire.

Lapu-Lapu was released on December 25, 2002 as part of the 28th Metro Manila Film Festival. Earning only ₱5.7 million by the end of the festival against a budget of at least ₱35 million, it was a box-office bomb. However, the film won seven FAP Awards, including Best Picture, Best Director (Mayo), and Best Actor (Lapid).

Cast
Lito Lapid as Lapu-Lapu
Joyce Jimenez as Bulakna
Dante Rivero as Magellan
Vic Vargas as Raha Humabon
Roi Vinzon as Datu Zula
Jeric Raval as Maltug
Ian Veneracion as Sebastian Del Cano
Bob Soler as Pigafetta
Jess Lapid Jr. as Zula's Man
Gloria Sevilla as Reyna Bauga
Cloyd Robinson as Padre Valderrama
Renato del Prado as Itong
Lucita Soriano as Mother of Katulanga
Cris Daluz as Father of Katulanga
Boy Alano as Lagum
Lilia Cuntapay as a Babaylan
Leon Miguel as Lapu-Lapu's Man
Boy Roque as Kawati

Production
A Spanish galleon replica was made for the film within a span of three months, and subsequently donated to a museum in Subic, Zambales after production. There were approximately 3,000 extras hired for the film.

Reception
At the 28th Metro Manila Film Festival (MMFF), the film lost the Best Film award to Spirit Warriors: The Shortcut, upon which the producers threatened to sue the festival organizers due to suspicions of manipulation.

Box office
Lapu-Lapu was the least-earning film at the box office among the nine entries of the 28th MMFF.

Critical response
The Catholic Initiative for Enlightened Movie Appreciation (CINEMA) rated the film "morally acceptable" and "technically average", with praise held for Lito Lapid and Joyce Jimenez's performances, while criticisms were directed at the incongruous film score and the galleon ship used for production, stating that the latter was "unbelievable".

Accolades

References

External links

2002 films
2000s historical films
Cultural depictions of Ferdinand Magellan
Films set in the 16th century
Films set in Cebu
Philippine historical films